Evgeny Mozer (born May 18, 1993) is a Russian professional ice hockey forward. He is currently an unrestricted free agent who most recently played for Avtomobilist Yekaterinburg in the Kontinental Hockey League (KHL).

Mozer made his KHL debut playing with Avangard Omsk during the 2012–13 KHL season. He played a season on loan in the Czech Extraliga with HC Dynamo Pardubice before returning to the KHL.

References

External links

1993 births
Living people
Avangard Omsk players
Avtomobilist Yekaterinburg players
HC Dynamo Moscow players
Omskie Yastreby players
HC Dynamo Pardubice players
Russian ice hockey forwards
Sportspeople from Omsk
Torpedo Nizhny Novgorod players
Yermak Angarsk players
Russian expatriate sportspeople in the Czech Republic
HC Neftekhimik Nizhnekamsk players
Russian expatriate ice hockey people
Expatriate ice hockey players in the Czech Republic